Potassium azide is the inorganic compound having the formula . It is a white, water-soluble salt. It is used as a reagent in the laboratory.

It has been found to act as a nitrification inhibitor in soil.

Structure
They crystallize in a tetragonal habit. The azide is bound to eight cations in an eclipsed orientation. The cations are bound to eight terminal N centers.

Synthesis and reactions
 is prepared by treating potassium carbonate with hydrazoic acid, which is generated in situ. In contrast, the analogous sodium azide is prepared (industrially) by the "Wislicenus process," which proceeds via the reaction sodium amide with nitrous oxide.

Upon heating or upon irradiation with ultraviolet light, it decomposes into potassium metal and nitrogen gas. The decomposition temperatures of the alkali metal azides are:  (275 °C),  (355 °C),  (395 °C),  (390 °C).

Under high pressures and high temperatures, potassium azide was found to transform into the K2N6 and K9N56 compounds, both containing hexazine rings: N and N64-, respectively.

Health hazards
Like sodium azide, potassium azide is very toxic. The TLV of the related sodium azide is 0.07 ppm. The toxicity of azides arise from their ability to inhibit cytochrome c oxidase.

References

Azides
Potassium compounds